UTC+00:00 is an identifier for a time offset from UTC of +00:00. This time zone is the basis of UTC and all other time zones are based on it. In ISO 8601, an example of the associated time would be written as 2023-01-01T12:12:34+00:00. It is also known by the following geographical or historical names:
Greenwich Mean Time
Western European Time
Azores Summer Time
Eastern Greenland Summer Time
Western Sahara Standard Time

As standard time (Northern Hemisphere winter)

Principal cities: London, Belfast, Glasgow, Cardiff, Dublin, Las Palmas de Gran Canaria, Santa Cruz de Tenerife, Lisbon, Porto

Europe

Western Europe 

Portugal (WET)
United Kingdom and the adjacent Crown Dependencies (Channel Islands and the Isle of Man) (GMT)
 (England, Wales, Scotland and Northern Ireland)

Faroe Islands (WET)

Atlantic islands 
Portugal
 Madeira (WET)
Spain
 Canary Islands (WET)

Notes:
The westernmost point where UTC with DST is applied is El Hierro, Canary Islands, Spain (18°00′ W). Time used there is 2 hours and 12 minutes ahead of physical time in the summer, making for the greatest discrepancy in the UTC time zone.
The easternmost settlement where UTC with DST is applied is Lowestoft in Suffolk, East Anglia, UK (at just 1°45′ E).
Morocco normally observes UTC+01:00, but the clock is set back one hour during Ramadan. See Time in Morocco for further information.
Whilst  Ireland operates on the same time as the United Kingdom, its  basis to do so differs. Whereas standard time in the UK is GMT in winter and BST (daylight saving time) in summer, Irish Standard Time (UTC+01:00) is observed in summer and GMT is used in winter. For details, see below.

As daylight saving time (Northern Hemisphere summer)

Europe

Arctic Ocean
Greenland
Ittoqqortoormiit and surrounding area
Portugal
Azores islands

As standard time (year-round)
Principal cities: Accra, Bamako, Dakar, Abidjan, Conakry, Ouagadougou, São Tomé, Reykjavík, Bissau, Monrovia, Bamako, Nouakchott, Freetown, Lomé, El Aaiún (Laayoune), Tifariti, Tindouf

Africa

West Africa

Greenwich Mean Time 
Burkina Faso
Côte d'Ivoire
Gambia
Ghana
Guinea
Guinea-Bissau
Liberia
Mali
Mauritania
Sahrawi Arab Democratic Republic (disputed territory)
São Tomé and Príncipe (since 2018)
Senegal
Sierra Leone
Togo

Europe (and possessions)

Atlantic islands
Greenland
Danmarkshavn and surrounding area
Iceland
United Kingdom
Saint Helena, Ascension and Tristan da Cunha
Saint Helena
Ascension Island
Tristan da Cunha

Antarctica
Some bases in Antarctica. See also Time in Antarctica
Norway
Troll Station

Notes:
The westernmost point where UTC with no DST is applied is Bjargtangar, at the northwest peninsula of Iceland (24°32′ W). Time used there is 1 hour and 38 minutes ahead of physical time. This is the greatest deviation from physical time for UTC+00:00 with no DST.

Discrepancies between use of UTC+00:00 as standard time rather than local solar time 

Since legal, political, social and economic criteria, in addition to physical or geographical criteria, are used in the drawing of time zones, actual time zones do not precisely adhere to meridian lines. The UTC+00:00 time zone, were it determined purely by longitude, would consist of the area between meridians 7°30′W and 7°30′E. However, in much of Western and Central Europe, despite lying between those two meridians, UTC+01:00 is used; similarly, there are European areas that use UTC, even though their physical time zone is UTC−01:00 (e.g. most of Portugal), or UTC−02:00 (the westernmost part of Iceland). Because the UTC+00:00 time zone in Europe is at its western edge, Lowestoft in the United Kingdom, at only 1°45′E, is the easternmost settlement in Europe in which UTC+00:00 is applied.

Countries and areas west of 22°30′W ("physical" UTC−02:00) that use UTC+00:00
 The westernmost part of Iceland, including the northwest peninsula (the Westfjords) and its main town of Ísafjörður, which is west of 22°30′W, uses UTC+00:00. Bjargtangar, Iceland is the westernmost point in which UTC is applied.

Countries and areas west of 7°30′W ("physical" UTC−01:00) that use UTC+00:00

In Europe 

 Canary Islands (Spain)
 Most of Portugal, including Lisbon, Porto, Braga, Aveiro, and Coimbra. (Only the easternmost part, including cities such as Bragança and Guarda, lies east of 7°30′W.) Madeira, even further to the west, also employs UTC. A more likely explanation is that during the mid-1970s, when Portugal was on Central European Time all year round, it did not begin to get light in Lisbon in winter until 08:30.
 The western part of Ireland, including the cities of Cork, Limerick, and Galway
 Westernmost tip of Northern Ireland, including the county town of County Fermanagh, Enniskillen
 Extreme westerly portion of the Outer Hebrides, in the west of Scotland; for instance, Vatersay, an inhabited island and the westernmost settlement of Great Britain, lies at 7°54′W. If uninhabited islands or rocks are taken into account St Kilda, west of the Outer Hebrides, at 8°58′W, and Rockall, at 13°41′W, should be included.
 Westernmost island of the Faroe Islands (autonomous region of the Danish Kingdom), Mykines
 Most of Iceland, including Reykjavík
 Northeastern part of Greenland, including Danmarkshavn

In Africa 
 Liberia
 Sierra Leone
 Guinea
 Guinea-Bissau
 Senegal
 The Gambia
Sahrawi Arab Democratic Republic (disputed territory)
 Most of Mauritania
 Southwesternmost part of Mali
The very westernmost part of Côte d'Ivoire

Countries that use UTC+01:00 as the basis for standard time although local solar time would suggest UTC+00:00

In Europe 
 Spain (except for the Canary Islands, which use UTC+00:00). Parts of Galicia, Extremadura and Andalucia lie west of 7°30′W ("physical" UTC−01:00), whereas there is no Spanish territory that even approaches 7°30′E (the boundary of "physical" UTC+01:00). Spain's time is the direct result of Generalissimo Franco's presidential order (published in Boletín Oficial del Estado of 8 March 1940) abandoning Greenwich Mean Time and advancing clocks one hour, effective from 23:00 on 16 March 1940. This is an excellent example of political criteria used in the drawing of time zones: the time change was passed "in consideration of the convenience from the national time marching in step according to that of other European countries". The presidential order (most likely enacted to be in synchrony with Nazi Germany and Fascist Italy, with which the Franco regime was unofficially allied) included in its 5th article a provision for its future phase out, which never took place. Due to this political decision Spain is two hours ahead of its local mean time during the summer, one hour ahead in winter.
 Andorra
 Belgium
 Most of France, including the cities of Paris, Marseille and Lyon. Only small parts of Alsace, Lorraine and Provence are east of 7°30′E ("physical" UTC+1).
 Ireland (Irish Standard Time is used in summer, GMT in winter: this is the reverse of the usual convention, but provides the same end results. See Time in the Republic of Ireland).
Luxembourg
 Monaco
 Netherlands
Gibraltar (United Kingdom)
The very westernmost part of Germany
Westernmost part of Switzerland
The very northwesternmost part of Italy
Bouvet Island and southwesternmost part of Norway

In Africa 
 Benin
Annobón Island (Equatorial Guinea)
 Western part of Niger
 Western part of Nigeria, including Lagos
 Most of Algeria, including Algiers
 Northeastern part of Morocco. Morocco normally uses UTC+01:00 but, in 2019, the country adopted UTC+00:00 during the month of Ramadan.

See also
Coordinated Universal Time (UTC), the basis for the world's civil time.

References

External links

UTC offsets